Qanat Bid or Qanat-e Bid may refer to:
 Qanat-e Bid, Jiroft
 Qanat Bid 1, Jiroft County
 Qanat Bid 2, Jiroft County
 Qanat Bid, Rabor